Valerie Elaine Taylor (born May 24, 1963) is an American computer scientist who is the director of the Mathematics and Computer Science Division of Argonne National Laboratory in Illinois. Her research includes topics such as performance analysis, power analysis, and resiliency. She is known for her work on "Prophesy," described as "a database used to collect and analyze data to predict the performance on different applications on parallel systems."

Early life and education 
Valerie Elaine Taylor was born May 24, 1963, in Chicago, Illinois. Taylor received her bachelor's and master's degrees in electrical engineering from Purdue University in 1985 and 1986, respectively.

In 1991, Taylor received her PhD at the University of California, Berkeley in electrical engineering and computer science, under advisor David Messerschmitt. She holds a patent for her dissertation work on sparse matrices.

Work 
Shortly after her PhD in 1993, Taylor earned an NSF National Young Investigator Award. She was a faculty member of Electrical Engineering and Computer Science Department at Northwestern University for 11 years.

From 2003 until 2011, she joined the Texas A&M University faculty as the Head of the Department of Computer Science and Engineering, working on high performance computing. There, she served as the senior associate dean of academic affairs in the College of Engineering and a Regents Professor and the Royce E. Wisenbaker Professor in the Department of Computer Science. She also began the Industries Affiliates Program which allows academics to engage industry partners.

While on the faculty of both Northwestern and Texas A&M, Taylor collaborated with research with Argonne National Laboratory, including a summer sabbatical in 2011. As of July 3, 2017, she is the director of the Mathematics and Computer Science Division of Argonne in Illinois. At Argonne, she cowrote the Department of Energy's comprehensive AI for Science report based on a series of Town Hall meetings.

Taylor is the CEO & President of the Center for Minorities and People with Disabilities in IT (CMD-IT). The organization seeks to develop the participation of minorities and people with disabilities in the IT workforce in the United States.

Recently, the U.S. Department of Energy awarded almost $54 million to fund ten new projects related to microelectronics design and production, of which Taylor will lead one project at the Argonne National Laboratory.

Awards and honors 
Taylor has received numerous awards for distinguished research, leadership, and efforts to increase diversity in computing. She has authored or co-authored more than 100 papers in the area of high performance computing, with a focus on performance analysis and modeling of parallel scientific applications.

Taylor is a member of IEEE. In 2013 she was elected a fellow of the Institute of Electrical and Electronics Engineers "for contributions to performance enhancement of parallel computing applications", and in 2016 as a Fellow of the Association for Computing Machinery for her "leadership in broadening participation in computing." In 2019, she was named an Argonne Distinguished Fellow, an award which represents only three percent of research staff at the facility.

Her awards include:

Richard A. Tapia Achievement Award for Scientific Scholarship, Civic Science, and Diversifying Computing
Outstanding Young Engineering Alumni Award from the University of California, Berkeley
 MOBE Influencers and Innovators of the Internet and Technology
Hewlett-Packard Harriet B. Rigas Education Award
Sigma Xi Distinguished Lecturer
A. Nico Habermann Award
AccessComputing Capacity Building Award

References

External links 

 Valerie Taylor's Biography and Oral Histories, from The HistoryMakers.
Valerie E. Taylor on Microsoft Academic Search
Valerie E. Taylor on ResearchGate
Valerie E. Taylor biography, from Argonne National Laboratory

Living people
1963 births
People from Chicago
Texas A&M University faculty
Northwestern University faculty
Fellows of the Association for Computing Machinery
Fellow Members of the IEEE
Women computer scientists
African-American computer scientists
American women computer scientists
American computer scientists
21st-century African-American people
20th-century African-American people